The Old Lumpkin County Jail is a historic jail building in Dahlonega, Georgia. The two-story brick jail was built in 1884. The first floor is now used by the Lumpkin County Historical Society and the second floor has been largely maintained in historic condition. Tours are given during Gold Rush Days in October. Bill Miner a.k.a. the Gentleman Bandit and Grey Fox were held in the jail. The county build a newer jail in 1964.  It was added to the National Register of Historic Places on September 13, 1985. It is located on Clarksville Street.

See also
National Register of Historic Places listings in Lumpkin County, Georgia

References

External links
Photo of jail on Flickr

Jails on the National Register of Historic Places in Georgia (U.S. state)
Buildings and structures in Lumpkin County, Georgia